Gyobingauk Township is a township in Tharrawaddy District in the Bago Region of Burma. The principal town is Gyobingauk.

References

 
Townships of the Bago Region
Tharrawaddy District